Rizzolo is an Italian surname. Notable people with the surname include:

 Antonio Rizzolo (born 1969), Italian footballer and manager
 Victor A. Rizzolo (1923–2017), American politician

See also
 Rizzoli (disambiguation)

Italian-language surnames